Steve Lazarowitz.(1962, New York, United States) is a writer. of Fantasy and Speculative Fiction. His fantasy serial Alaric Swifthand first appeared in Dragon's Claw Ezine (1997.)  Music to My Ears was selected for The Best of the Hood Special Edition (anthology.)  In 2000,  "A Creative Edge: Tales of Speculation" won the Anthology category in the 2000 Dream Realm Awards.  "Reflections of a Recovering Servant" was released by Twilight times books in 2002. "Dream Sequence and other Tales from Beyond", was published by Double Dragon Publishing . In 2003,   he resides in Hobart Tasmania with his wife and son and current menagerie.

References

External links
- Alaric Swifthand - Review
- Dream Sequence - Author's Website
- Partial bibliography - Author's Website
- A Cure for the Common Curse
- A Leaf in the Wind
- Consigned to Darkness
- Dream Sequence and Other Tales from Beyond
- Reflections of a Recovering Servant
- Reflections of a Reflection
- The Cup and the Bucket
- You Don’t Need to Buy This Book
- Novelspot Staff Bio

American fantasy writers
American short story writers
Living people
1962 births
Writers from New York City
American male short story writers
American male novelists
Novelists from New York (state)